Web novels in South Korea have been growing in popularity in the 21st century. Among e-publishing fields, web novels are the core contents that are leading the e-book market. Just as webtoons (online comics) grew in the early 2000s in South Korea, web novels have been growing rapidly since 2010.

The usual definition of a web novel is 'the first novel to be released on the web'. This definition is based on the nature of distinguishing web novels from other content, first of all, the basis for mediating novels with readers, second of which the web releases them for the first time, and lastly has a narrative form. In particular, the Web novel market has begun to receive great attention because the possibility of web novel contents expansion like drama has been confirmed.

History 
The term 'Web novel' was used in South Korea after Naver, a portal site, launched Naver Web novel in 2013. Before that, it was called various words such as Internet novels and online novels. Currently, the term 'web novel' is used in both industrial and academic fields.

South Korean web novels began to spread in late 1990 with literature of PC communication such as Chollian and Hitel (The current service has been terminated). These novels were called the so-called 'first generation fantasy of Korea.' Some of the representative works include 「The Soul Guardians」() (1993), 「The Legend of Maian」() (1995), 「The Raising Falcon」() (1996), 「Dragon Raja」(1997), 「Karsearin: Adventures of a Red Dragon」() (1998), 「Dragon's Temple」() (1998) and 「Mookhyang」() (1998). After the introduction of the Internet in the late 1990s, PC communication disappeared and Internet novels became active in earnest. Since 2000, unstable social conditions such as the IMF economic crisis and the end of the century syndrome have caused people to fall into virtual reality. As a result, amateur writers appeared in large numbers, and genre literature, not pure literature, became popular based on the Internet. Web novels were popular in other countries around the same time, with a slight difference in terms. Web novels are called Web fiction in the United States and Internet literature (网络文学) in China. At that time, numerous Internet novels appeared. The most representative writer is Gwiyeoni. Her works were also successful, being made into cartoons and movies. Some of the representative works include 「My Sassy Girl」(2001) and 「He Was Cool」(2004).

After the IMF, there were many book rental stores in Korea. This was because the book rental store was a start-up item. The genre novels that were serialized on the Internet were often published and bought at book rental stores. However, the market for book rental shops did not last long. Internet novels have various distribution channels. Web novels have begun to be paid for. In April 2007, an e-book company, Booktopia (The current service has been terminated), opened a genre novel website called Waki. In 2008, BookCube opened a bookstore specializing in e-books. Both bookstores used a per-part payment format. Joara, a popular serial site until now, also started charging at this time, but it didn't work well. It opened its 'Premium' section in 2011. The 'Premium' section wasn't profitable until 2014.

Meanwhile, the e-book market has continued to expand in recent years. In January 2013, Naver Web Novel began. The portal's influence was enormous. The novel, which used to be called "Internet novels" and "playwright novels", instantly changes its name to "web novels". In February of the same year, Kakao Page appeared. Kakao Page has now become the center of the genre novel market.

Since October 2022, a service such as YONDER have begun to officially translate Korean web novels into English.

Features

Web based system 
Web novels are all produced, distributed, and consumed on the Web. This has brought a big change to the existing publishing industry. Web-based channels other than those that previously had great influence in the publishing industry have become very influential in the web novel industry. In addition, the process of producing, distributing, and consuming web novels takes place almost simultaneously. Also, as payment methods are now easier in digital, readers can enjoy web novels, which are priced at around 100 won per episode.

Serialization 
The reason why serialization is important in web novels is that it not only enables gradual commercialization but also allows potential readers to flow through interaction. Therefore, the know-how of ending the story is important in each episode where the reader's curiosity reaches its peak. Also, inter-episode connectivity is an important determinant for readers to read the next episode.

Interaction 
Interaction with readers through comments is an important component of a web novel. In the process of producing web novels, the author can check the comments and views to distinguish between what readers enjoy and what readers show low interest. However, this can put a lot of pressure on the writer. This could also lead to undermining the author's creativity. Nevertheless, interaction through comments has brought about a new change in the relationship between writing and readers, which has been fixed in the past, and has brought new possibilities for literature.

ExtenSalesity 
Web novels have the potential to expand into other content. Due to short breathing and rapid development, it is highly immersive and easy to visualize because it has a drama format. In China, web novels are attracting attention as IP (Intellectual Property) that are easy to develop with various contents such as webtoons, movies and games. In fact, works from the original web novel are becoming popular.

Main Platforms of Web novel

Joara 
"Serialist", which was opened in November, 2000, and "Ujoa", which was opened in March, 2001.「Invisible Dragon」() (2002) caused a great sensation. In June 2003, "Joara" was officially established. Joara is the nation's largest web novel platform with 140,000 writers, with an average of 2,400 serials per day and 420,000 works. Joara went into the red for eight years after starting business. the company posted 12.5 billion won in sales in 2015 as profits were generated from 2009. Its membership is 1.1 million, and it uses 8.6 million cases a day on average (2016). Since Joara's users have almost the same gender ratio, both fantasy and romance genres are in high demand. The top 10 in the 'Noblesse' and 'Premium' categories were dominated by fantasy and romance genres. However, parody and BL genre are outstanding in the free series category.

Munpia 
"Go! Murim," which was opened in 2002 by writers of martial arts novels such as 'Geumgang (currently CEO Kim Hwan-cheol).' The site focused on the genre of martial arts novels, and was characterized by the high age range of readers. The site has accepted a large number of fantasy writers and readers and changed its name to "Gomofan." There was another change after that. It changed to Munpia in 2006 and started paid service in 2013. Munpia currently has 450,000 members and 500,000 daily visitors, and 31,000 writers are active. Munpia has 60,000 copies and 700,000 serials, 20,000 exclusive works, and more than 2,700 new works each month (2016). In May 2021, Naver partnered with CJ Group's CJ ENM to acquire Munpia Inc, the third largest web-novel platform in Korea.

Naver Web Novel (and SERIES) 
Naver Web Novel first started its service on January 15, 2013. It is a web novel platform under Naver, the nation's top search engine. According to a January 2016 Naver press release, more than 5 million readers have accessed Naver's web novels more than once a month, which is loved by many readers. Among the official serial writers of Naver's web novels, 26 made more than 100 million won a year, while the highest-earning authors earned 470 million won in 2018 alone. The works of Naver Web Novel have some differences in format with other platforms. It is to attach a small character illustration to the front of the conversation. It is unique that the characters of the work can be identified only by illustrations without knowing the context of who said the words. Naver reorganized its web novel platform Naver SERIES in 2018 and is focusing on marketing SERIES. It has also reorganized its paid content activation model. "Free for You" allows only users to see web novels free of charge if they wait a certain amount of time.

KakaoPage 
KakaoPage first started its service on April 9, 2013, but it did not mainly serve web novels and webtoons from the beginning. At first, it was designed as an open market where developers of various contents can freely upload mobile content. However, it was not widely used due to lack of publicity for its users.

From April 21, 2014, the webtoon and web novel service began free of charge. Based on popular works such as 「Legendary Moonlight Sculptor」(2007), the company has secured a large number of users through active marketing to potential users such as providing items to Kakao Talk users, and is currently one of the pillars of the web publishing market.

KakaoPage's webtoons and web novels include serial novels managed by the headquarters and "Waiting for free" and books provided by various publishers. "Waiting for free" is a service model that allows users to watch the next episode for free after a certain period of time from the moment they watch the first episode. They are not allowed to post content by individual writers, such as Naver N Store (It's now merged with SERIES.), and they can only upload content through partner companies.

Ridi 
Since 2017, Ridi Corporation has been expanding its content spectrum, serving web novels in different products.

Genre 
The genres of web novels are complex and fast, but the representative genres can be divided into romance, fantasy, martial arts, and modernity. In web novels, romance genres are produced and consumed the most. In the case of Naver, a total of 25,542 web novels were posted on the N store as of August 2015, of which romance topped the list with 13,164 (64.08 percent). SF and Fantasy came in second with 3,540 pieces (17.23%), martial arts ranked third with 2,420 pieces (11.78%), mystery fifth with 865 pieces (4.36%), and Light Novel (ライトノベル) with 238 pieces (1.16%). Recently, Romance Fantasy has been in the spotlight. Romance Fantasy is a new genre novel that has been available on Naver since April 2017, meaning romance-based fantasy. While fantasy mainly uses hero adventure stories as its main story line, Romance Fantasy mainly uses romance as its main story line. Game web novels are also gaining popularity. Game web novels typically use game elements such as quests, items, and NPCs as narrative materials. Game web novels are intermingling with fantasy novels, expanding their reach with young readers who are familiar with the game.

Market 
Platform, CP (Contents Provider) and writer are the main players in the web novel industry. The platform receives and distributes web novels from authors and CP to provide web novels to readers. Contracts and excavations with writers are usually made through direct submissions to the platform or holding contests on the platform itself. CP receives web novels from writers and processes them in various forms. CP generates revenue by publishing a series of fictitious web novels on the platform. It also generates profits by publishing serial or completed works in paper books or by producing and selling goods.

Sixty-four percent of web novels are romance, and 95 percent of romance readers are women. Also, people in their 30s and 40s account for 64 percent of web novel readers (2015).

Sales 
The market for web novels, which was worth 10 billion won in 2013, is estimated to have grown to 400 billion won in 2018. The market has grown 40 times in five years. In 2019, the market for web novels exceeded 500 billion won.

Media franchise 

Web novels have the greatest potential as source stories that can be extended to various forms of content. Web novels have important value in that they can test the marketability of animations, movies, and dramas that are relatively risky because web novels cost less in the beginning. Thus, web novels can gain greater market value through thinking about how to use them rather than their value as a web novel itself. The above Works based on South Korean novels category is not accurate because it does not only organize web novels, therefore, it is listed separately here.

References

External links 
 Joara 
 Munpia 
 Naver Web Novel 
 Naver Series 
 KakaoPage 
 Ridi 

South Korean novels
Web novels
Literature websites
Interactive fiction